Ramón Hoyos Vallejo (26 May 1932 – 19 November 2014) was a Colombian road bicycle racer who won the men's individual road race at the 1959 Pan American Games. He represented his native country twice at the Summer Olympics; in 1956 and 1960. He also won the Vuelta a Colombia five times: in 1953, 1954, 1955, 1956 and 1958.

Major results

1952
 1st Stage 9 Vuelta a Colombia
1953
 1st  Overall Vuelta a Colombia
1st Stages 4, 5, 6, 7, 10, 11, 12, 15
1954
 1st  Team time trial, Central American and Caribbean Games (with Héctor Mesa, Justo Londoño and Efraín Forero)
 1st  Overall Vuelta a Colombia
1st Stages 2, 3, 4, 10, 11, 13
 1st  Overall Vuelta a Puerto Rico
1st Stages 2 & 5
1955
 1st  Road race, Pan American Games
 1st  Overall Vuelta a Colombia
1st Stages 1, 2, 3, 4, 5, 6, 10, 11, 12, 14, 16, 18
1956
 1st  Overall Vuelta a Colombia
1st Stages 3, 5, 7, 8, 11, 12, 16 & 17
 1st Stages 7 & 14 Vuelta a Mexico
1958
 1st  Overall Vuelta a Colombia
1st Stages 2, 11 & 14
1959
 1st  Team time trial, Central American and Caribbean Games (with Pablo Hurtado and Efraín Forero)
1960
 1st Stage 4 Vuelta a Colombia

References

1932 births
2014 deaths
Colombian male cyclists
Cyclists at the 1956 Summer Olympics
Cyclists at the 1960 Summer Olympics
Olympic cyclists of Colombia
Sportspeople from Antioquia Department
Pan American Games gold medalists for Colombia
Pan American Games medalists in cycling
Cyclists at the 1955 Pan American Games
Medalists at the 1955 Pan American Games
20th-century Colombian people